Awach Tende is a settlement in Kenya's Homa Bay County. Awach Tende is also the name of a river in the Lake Victoria catchment area. Along with Awach Kibuon, it is known as South Awach.

History 
Before the Kenyan general election in 2013, Awach voted as part of the Nyanza Province.

References 

Populated places in Nyanza Province